The Grangegeeth Group is a geologic group in Ireland. It preserves fossils dating back to the Ordovician period.

See also

 List of fossiliferous stratigraphic units in Ireland

References
 

Geologic groups of Europe
Geologic formations of Ireland
Ordovician System of Europe
Ordovician Ireland